Vidal Valley is a 20-mile (32 km) long valley in the far eastern Colorado Desert bordering the Colorado River. Most of the valley is in eastern San Bernardino County, California, but the outfall on the Colorado River is in northeast Riverside County. Vidal Valley forms the large border of the south side of the east-west block of the Whipple Mountains massif, the landform that forces the Colorado to flow southeast, then back southwest. The southeast exit of the valley into Parker Valley on the Colorado River skirts the north end of the Riverside Mountains (see photo). The Colorado River Aqueduct crosses the midpoint of the valley at Vidal Junction, California. The Vidal Valley also lies due east of the Danby Dry Lake landform.

Geography
Vidal Valley is bordered by the Whipple Mountains on the northeast and the Riverside Mountains on the south. The valley drains mostly northwest-to-southeast, with its outfall into a southwest-flowing section of the Colorado River. The north of the valley is bordered on the west by the Turtle Mountains, and the south side of the Chemehuevi Valley. The center point of the valley, both east-west and north-south is at Vidal Junction located at U.S. Route 95 in California and California State Route 62.

Natural history
The Vidal Valley is in the climate, ecoregion, and plant community transition zone to the higher Mojave Desert on the north from the lower-elevation Colorado Desert on the south.

Watersheds
The Vidal Valley watershed enters the Colorado River opposite the Bouse Wash Watershed in western Arizona. Both watersheds enter the Parker Valley, mostly occupied by the Colorado River Indian Reservation. As desert washes, typically little or no water flows at the outfall points into the Colorado River, except during rainstorm events. Both the Vidal Valley and the Bouse Wash are in the north of the Imperial Reservoir Watershed.

The headwater region of the valley is north of Vidal Junction; the water divide is east of the Turtle Mountains, and due west of the east-west trending Whipple Mountains block. North of the water divide is the southside of Chemehuevi Valley and Chemehuevi Wash.

See also
Lower Colorado River Valley
Tyson Wash, (adjacent Bouse Wash)

References

External links
Pleistocene, Quaternary carbonate dating study, Vidal Valley
Lost Arch Mine, adjacent Vidal Valley
Imperial Reservoir Watershed Map
Bouse Wash Watershed Map
Tyson Wash Watershed Map

Tributary valleys of the Lower Colorado River Valley
Valleys of the Mojave Desert
Geography of the Colorado Desert
Valleys of San Bernardino County, California
Valleys of Riverside County, California
Valleys of California